Boscia mossambicensis is a species of plant in family Capparaceae, which is native to East and southern Africa, where it occurs at lower elevations.

Range
It occurs in Botswana, the southern DRC, Ethiopia, Kenya, Mozambique, Namibia, Somalia, South Africa (eastern Limpopo and eastern Mpumalanga provinces), Tanzania, Zambia and Zimbabwe.

See also 
 List of Southern African indigenous trees and woody lianes

References

External links 
 
 
 Boscia mossambicensis at The Plant List
 Boscia mossambicensis at Tropicos

mossambicensis
Flora of Southern Africa
Plants described in 1861